Maulvi Shamsuddin Pahlawan (مولوي شمس الدین پهلوان) (born;) is an Afghan Taliban politician. Shamsuddin is currently serving as acting Deputy Minister of Agriculture, Irrigation and Livestock since 4 October 2021. He has also served as Governor of Wardak Province under Islamic Emirate of Afghanistan (1996–2001).

References

Living people
1968 births
People from Badakhshan Province
Taliban governors
Governors of Maidan Wardak Province
Taliban government ministers of Afghanistan